Saint-Yves (9 November 1808 – 23 July 1871) was the pen name of  Édouard Déaddé, a 19th-century French playwright.

Short biography 
He was born Ernest-Antoine-Edmond-Édouard Déaddé in Paris. An employee at the Interior ministry, he became known as vaudevilliste under the pen name Saint-Yves and published numerous articles in the Revue et gazette musicale under the pseudonym D.A.D. 
 
His numerous plays were presented on the most important Parisian stages of his time, including the Théâtre du Panthéon, the Théâtre des Variétés, the Théâtre du Palais-Royal, the Théâtre de l'Ambigu, the Théâtre des Folies-Dramatiques, and the Théâtre de la Gaîté. Several collaborative projects were discussed with Honoré de Balzac but none were realized.

He was the managing director of the Théâtre de la Porte-Saint-Antoine from 31 December 1839 to January 1841.

Works 

 Odette, ou la Petite reine, chronique-vaudeville du temps de Charles VI, 1832
 Le te deum et le de profundis, one-act comédie en vaudeville, with Benjamin Antier and Victor Ratier, 1832
 Léonie, ou les Suites de la colère, 1833
 Une matinée à Vincennes, ou le Conciliateur, comédie en vaudeville in 1 act, 1834
 Le souper du diable, vaudeville in 1 act, 1834
 Un pélerinage, comédie-vaudeville in 1 act, 1835
 La Préface de Gil Blas, one-act play, 1835
 Casque en cuir et pantalon garance, with Xavier Veyrat, 1836
 Le Maugrabin, drame mêlé de chants, 1836
 La fille du Danube, ou Ne m'oubliez pas, drame-vaudeville in 2 acts and extravaganza, with Veyrat, 1836
 Les Gitanos, ou le Prince et le chevrier, historical comedy in 1 act mingled with song, 1836
 La Caisse d'épargne, comédie-vaudeville in 1 act, with Édouard Delalain, 1836
 Le Début de Talma, comédie-vaudeville in 1 act, 1836
 Rosette, ou Promettre et tenir, comédie en vaudeville in 2 periods, with Alexandre de Lavergne, 1836
 L'Amour d'une reine, drama in 3 acts, 1837
 Le Forgeron, drame-vaudeville in 1 act, with Delalain, 1837
 Les ombres chinoises, comédie vaudeville in 2 acts, 1837
 Les marchands de bois, vaudeville in 1 act, with Hector Monréal, 1837
 Tabarin, ou un Bobêche d'autrefois, fantaisie in 1 act, mingled with song, 1837
 Les Regrets, vaudeville in 1 act, with X. Veyrat, 1837
 Rose et Colas, ou Une pièce de Sedaine, comédie en vaudeville in 2 acts, with Delalain and Victor Ratier, 1838
 Le Mariage d'orgueil, comédie en vaudeville in 2 acts, with Adolphe d'Ennery, 1838
 Une histoire de voleurs, drame vaudeville in 1 act, with Delalain, 1838
 Turcs et bayadères, ou le Bal de l'Ambigu, folie de carnaval in 2 tableaux mingled with couplets, with Amable de Saint-Hilaire, 1838
 Sous la Régence, comédie en vaudeville in 1 act, with Delalain, 1838
 La Fabrique, drame-vaudeville in 3 acts, with Édouard Delalain, 1839
 Mme de Brienne, drama in 2 acts, with Max Raoul, 1839
 Béatrix, drama in 4 acts, 1839
 Madame de Brienne, drama in 2 acts and in prose, 1839
 La Tarentule, imitation du ballet de l'Opéra, in 2 acts, mingled with song and dance, 1839
 Les Oiseaux de Bocace, vaudeville, with Desroziers, 1840
 Cocorico ou La poule de ma tante, vaudeville in 5 acts, with Michel Masson and Ferdinand de Villeneuve, 1840
 L'Autre ou les Deux maris, vaudeville in 1 act, with Alfred Desroziers, 1840
 Dinah l'Egyptienne, drama in 3 acts mingled with song, with Louis Lefebvre, 1840
 Le Piège à loup, vaudeville in 1 act, with X. Veyrat, 1841
 Au vert galant !, vaudeville in 2 acts, with Angel, 1842
 Eva ou le Grillon du foyer, comédie en vaudeville in 2 acts, with Choler, 1842
 Les Femmes et le secret, vaudeville in 1 act, with Delalain, 1843
 Le Saut périlleux, vaudeville in 1 act, 1843
 Les Naufrageurs de Kérougal, drama in 4 acts, extravaganza with Auguste-Louis-Désiré Boulé and Jules Chabot de Bouin, 1843
 La Perle de Morlaix, drame-vaudeville in 3 acts, with Édouard Delalain and Hippolyte Hostein, 1843
 La Tête de singe, vaudeville in 2 acts, with Dumanoir and Desroziers, 1844
 Brancas le rêveur, comédie en vaudeville in 1 act, with Alexandre de Lavergne, 1845
 L'Homme aux trente écus, comédie en vaudeville in 1 act, with Édouard Brisebarre, 1845
 Mademoiselle Bruscambille, comédie en vaudeville in 1 act, 1845
 Le fils du diable, drama in 5 acts and 11 tableaux, with Paul Féval, 1847
 Le Pot au lait, fable by La Fontaine, set in action, 1847
 Impressions de ménage, comédie en vaudeville in 1 act, with Brisebarre, 1847
 Mademoiselle Grabutot, vaudeville in 1 act, with Adolphe Choler, 1847
 Le Protégé de Molière, comedy in 1 act, in verses, 1848
 La république de Platon, vaudeville in 1 act, with Choler, 1848
 Candide ou Tout est pour le mieux, tale mingled with couplets in 3 acts and 5 tableaux, with Clairville et Choler, 1848
 Les Barricades de 1848, opéra patriotique in 1 act and 2 tableaux, with Brisebarre, 1848
 Une chaine anglaise, comédie en vaudeville in 3 acts, with Eugène Labiche, 1848
 Histoire de rire, vaudeville in 1 act, with Labiche, 1848
 Mademoiselle Carillon, vaudeville in 1 act, with Angel, 1849
 Le Baron de Castel-Sarrazin, comédie en vaudeville in 1 act, with Clairville and Alfred Desroziers, 1849
 Le Congrès de la paix, à-propos in 1 act, mingled with couplets, with Clairville, 1849
 Une femme exposée, vaudeville in 1 act, with Angel, 1849
 Les manchettes d'un vilain, comédie en vaudeville in 2 acts, with Labiche and Auguste Lefranc, 1849
 Le Marin de la garde, opéra comique in 1 act, 1849
 La Paix du ménage, comédie en vaudeville in 1 act, with Choler, 1849
 La baronne Bergamotte, comédie en vaudeville in 2 acts, with X.-B. Saintine, 1850
 Les Étoiles, ou le Voyage de la fiancée, vaudeville fantastique in 3 acts and 6 tableaux, 1850
 Le Rossignol des salons, comédie en vaudeville in 1 act, with Xavier de Montépin, 1850
 La Jeunesse de Louis XIV (1648), vaudeville anecdotique, 1851
 La Fille de Frétillon, vaudeville in 1 act, with Choler, 1851
 Belphégor, vaudeville fantastique in 1 act, with Choler and Dumanoir, 1851
 La Mort aux rats, folie-vaudeville in 1 acti, 1851
 Le Mari d'une jolie femme, comédie en vaudeville in 1 act, with Choler, 1851
 Alice, ou L'ange du foyer, comédie en vaudeville in 1 act, with Émile Colliot, 1852
 Marie Simon, drama in 5 acts, with Jules-Édouard Alboize de Pujol and Choler, 1852
 L'Amour au daguerréotype, vaudeville in 1 act, with Charles Varin, 1853
 Le Mariage au bâton, comédie en vaudeville in 1 act, with Xavier Eyma, 1853
 L'héritage de ma tante, comédie en vaudeville in 1 act, with Choler, 1854
 Le cousin Verdure, comédie en vaudeville in 1 act, with Pierre Zaccone, 1855
 Flaneuse, vaudeville in 1 act, 1855
 Zerbine, tableau bouffe, with Octave Féré, 1856
 La chanteuse de marbre, with O.Féré, 1857
 Le Nez d'argent, vaudeville in 1 act, with Choler and Alfred Delacour, 1857
 La belle Gabrielle, with O. Féré, 1857
 Les Chevaliers errants. Zohra la Morisque, with O. Féré, 1857
 Pianella, operetta in 1 act, with O. Féré, 1860
 Un bal sur la tête, vaudeville in 1 act, with Victor Bernard and Paul Siraudin, 1860
 Comme on gâte sa vie, comédie en vaudeville in 3 acts, with Choler, 1860
 Le sou de Lise, operetta in 1 act, with Zaccone, 1860
 Les Trabucayres, with O.Féré, 1862
 Le Comte de Bonneval, histoire du siècle dernier, with O. Féré, 1863
 Détournement de majeure, vaudeville in 1 act, with V. Bernard, and P. Siraudin, 1863
 Les Quatre femmes d'un pacha, with O. Féré, 1864
 Splendeurs et misères d'un renégat, with O. Féré, 1864
 Le Baron de Trenck, with Octave Féré, 1865
 Un mariage royal, with O. Féré, 1865
 Une femme dégelée, vaudeville in 1 act, with Choler and Clairville, 1865
 Les Chevaliers d'aventures, with O.Féré, 1865
 Les Amours du comte de Bonneval, with Octave Féré, 1866
 Louise de Guzman, with O. Féré, 1866
 Les Quatre femmes d'un pacha, with O. Féré, 1867
 Mademoiselle Pacifique, comédie en vaudeville in 1 act, with Choler, 1868
 L'Anneau de la veuve, 1870
 Le mari de la tzarine, with O. Féré, 1891 (posthumous)

Notes

Bibliography 
 Joseph M. Quérard, Charles Louandre, La littérature française contemporaine, 1848, (p. 157) (read online)
 Joseph-Marie Quérard, Maulde et Renou, Les supercheries littéraires dévoilées, 1852, (p. 248)
 Edmond Antoine Poinsot, Dictionnaire des Pseudonymes, 1869, (p. 305)
 Gustave Vapereau, Dictionnaire universel des contemporains, 1870, (p. 491) (read online) 
 Pierre Larousse, Nouveau Larousse illustré, "Déaddé (Edouard)", vol. 3 (1898), (p. 537).
 Wild, Nicole (1989). Dictionnaire des théâtres parisiens au XIXe siècle: les théâtres et la musique. Paris: Aux Amateurs de livres. .  (paperback). View formats and editions at WorldCat.

External links 
 Saint-Yves on Data.bnf.fr

19th-century French dramatists and playwrights
Writers from Paris
1808 births
1871 deaths